The Hydaburg Totem Park is a city park in the small community of Hydaburg, Alaska, located on the western side of Prince of Wales Island in southeastern Alaska. The park is also part of the many parks inside the Tongass National Forest. The park, created in 1939, contains a collection of preserved and recreated totem poles, based on originals collected from small communities abandoned by the Haida people to form Hydaburg.  The old totem poles were brought to the park by crews from the Civilian Conservation Corps, and were recreated and preserved under the guidance of Haida master carvers.  The park has been the subject of a major restoration effort in the 2010s.

The park was listed on the National Register of Historic Places in 2006.

See also
National Register of Historic Places listings in Prince of Wales–Hyder Census Area, Alaska

References

1939 establishments in Alaska
Buildings and structures completed in 1939
Civilian Conservation Corps in Alaska
Haida
Historic districts on the National Register of Historic Places in Alaska
National Register of Historic Places in Prince of Wales–Hyder Census Area, Alaska
Parks on the National Register of Historic Places in Alaska
Totem poles in the United States

External links 
Hydaburg Totem Park at The Living New Deal Project